Valverde is an administrative neighborhood (barrio) of Madrid belonging to the district of Fuencarral-El Pardo. As of 1 March 2020, it has a population of 65,022. The historic centre of Fuencarral (Fuencarral Pueblo), belongs to the Valverde neighborhood. The Hospital Universitario Ramón y Cajal is also located in the neighborhood.

References 

Wards of Madrid
Fuencarral-El Pardo